U Microscopii is a Mira variable star in the constellation Microscopium. It ranges from magnitude 7 to 14.4 over a period of 334 days. The Astronomical Society of Southern Africa in 2003 reported that observations of U Microscopii were very urgently needed as data on its light curve was incomplete.

References

Mira variables
Microscopium
Microscopii, U
M-type giants
Durchmusterung objects
194814
101063
Emission-line stars